Trefoil factor 1 is a protein that in humans is encoded by the TFF1 gene (also called pS2 gene).

Function 

Members of the trefoil family are characterized by having at least one copy of the trefoil motif, a 40-amino acid domain that contains three conserved disulfides. They are stable secretory proteins expressed in gastrointestinal mucosa. Their functions are not defined, but they may protect the mucosa from insults, stabilize the mucus layer, and affect healing of the epithelium. This gene, which is expressed in the gastric mucosa, has also been studied because of its expression in human tumors. This gene and two other related trefoil family member genes are found in a cluster on chromosome 21.

Glycan binding 
All three human trefoil factors are lectins that interact specifically with the disaccharide GlcNAc-α-1,4-Gal. This disaccharide is an unusual glycotope that is only known to exist on the large, heavily glycosylated, mucins in the mucosa. By cross-linking mucins through the bivalent binding of this glycotope, the trefoil factors are then able to reversibly modulate the thickness and viscosity of the mucus.

In gastric carcinoma

TFF1 expression is frequently lost in gastric carcinoma, probably through mechanism of DNA methylation, and it is therefore considered as a tumor suppressor gene.

References

Further reading